Raymond Rocco Monto, M.D. (born November 20, 1960) is a Board Certified orthopaedic surgeon with a practice on Nantucket, Massachusetts. Monto's work includes developments in sports medicine, Tennis elbow surgery, hip arthroscopy, platelet-rich plasma, and innovative orthobiologic treatments for chronic disorders including Achilles tendonitis and plantar fasciitis. Monto lectures frequently in the United States and around the world.

Background
Raymond Rocco Monto was born in Ironbound, New Jersey.  He played intercollegiate soccer at Haverford College, where he received a Bachelor of Arts Degree in 1982. He was co-captain of the soccer team and was a regional NSCAA All America selection in 1981. Dr. Monto graduated magna cum laude with Departmental High Honors in Biology from Haverford College with a Bachelor of Arts degree. He was inducted into the Phi Beta Kappa Society in 1981. Monto earned his Doctor of Medicine degree (M.D.) at the New York University School of Medicine in 1986. During medical school he was an all-star goalkeeper in the Cosmopolitan Soccer League first division, reaching the U.S. national championship Final Four in 1983 with the Union Lancers. He completed his orthopedic surgery residency at Duke University in 1992, and was a fellow at the Steadman Hawkins Clinic in knee and shoulder reconstruction.

Career and awards
Dr. Monto began his career in Huntingdon Valley, Pennsylvania, before starting the first orthopedic surgery and sports medicine practice on Martha's Vineyard, Massachusetts in 1996. After treating large numbers of metatarsal foot fractures on the island he became known for diagnosing the "Vineyard fracture". In a controversial move in 2013, he relocated his practice to Nantucket. He is a media spokesperson and fellow of the American Academy of Orthopaedic Surgeons Monto has won several awards, including the 2012 Jacques Duparc research award from the European Federation of National Associations of Orthopaedics and Traumatology for his work on tennis elbow; the 2014 European Hip Society Research Finalist Award; the Smith-Nephew Resident Scholar Award, the Piedmont Orthopedic Society Research Award from Duke University, the Smith & Nephew Orthopedic Resident Scholar Award, and the Magill Rhoads Scholar Award from Haverford College. Monto has lectured extensively across the United States and Europe, giving over 100 presentations and demonstrating orthopedic innovations including the use of platelet rich plasma and novel total knee arthroplasty techniques. Monto serves as a consultant reviewer for many international orthopedic journals including the Journal of Bone and Joint Surgery, Bone and Joint Research, and Arthroscopy. He is a lead team physician for United States Soccer and has been a sports medicine consultant to the United States Ski Team, Boston Ballet, and Real Madrid C.F., and has served in many capacities for Nantucket Cottage Hospital including chief administrative officer, president of the medical staff, chief of surgery, director of physical therapy and sports medicine, and member of the hospital's board of trustees. Dr. Monto's first book, The Fountain: A Doctor's Prescription to Make 60 the New 30 was published by Rodale Books  Penguin Random House in 2018.

Publications
Additionally, Monto has published numerous medical articles in peer-reviewed journals.

Partial list:
"Engineered bone graft." (July 2016) American Journal of Orthopedics. http://www.mdedge.com/amjorthopedics/article/109998/engineered-bone-graft
"Tennis elbow repair with or without anchors: a randomized clinical trial." (September 2014) Techniques in Shoulder and Elbow Surgery. http://journals.lww.com/shoulderelbowsurgery/Abstract/2014/09000/Tennis_Elbow_Repair_With_or_Without_Suture.5.aspx doi: 10.1097/BTE.0000000000000027
"Platelet-rich plasma efficacy versus corticosteroid injection treatment for chronic severe plantar fasciitis." (April 2014) Foot and Ankle International. 
"Platelet-rich plasma and plantar fasciitis.” (December 2013) Sports Medicine and Arthroscopy. 
“Platelet rich plasma treatment for chronic Achilles tendinosis.” (May 2012) Foot and Ankle International. 
“Magnetic resonance imaging in the evaluation of tibial eminence fractures in adults."(July 2006) Journal of Knee Surgery. 
“So-called trigger ankle due to an aberrant flexor hallucis longus muscle in a tennis player. A case report.” (February 1992) Journal of Bone and Joint Surgery. 
“Medical support for athletic events.” (August 1991) Physician Assistant. 
“Rupture of the posterior tibial tendon associated with closed ankle fracture.” (June 1991) Foot and Ankle. 
“Fatal fat embolism following total condylar knee arthroplasty.” (December 1990) Journal of Arthroplasty. 
“Team physician #9. The role and responsibilities of the competition physician.” (November 1990) Orthopedic Reviews.

References

External links
Rocco Monto, MD homepage

1960 births
Duke University alumni
Haverford College alumni
Living people
New York University Grossman School of Medicine alumni
American orthopedic surgeons